Gesina is a Dutch feminine given name. Like the German form Gesine it originated, perhaps via the hypocorism "Ge" and diminutive "Gesie", from Geertruida/Gertrude. People with the name include:

Johanna Gesina Bonger (1862–1925), wife of Theo van Gogh, key player in the growth of Vincent van Gogh's fame
Gesina ter Borch (1633–1690), Dutch watercolorist and draftswoman, sister of Gerard ter Borch 
Gesina Maria "Ina" van Faassen (1928–2011), Dutch actress and comedian
Gesina "Ina" ter Laak-Spijk (1931–2002), Dutch short and middle distance runner
Henriëtte Gesina Numans (1877–1955), Dutch painter

See also
Gęsina, a village in central Poland

References

Dutch feminine given names